The Nitro Girls were a dance team in World Championship Wrestling. Their initial function was to dance and entertain the live crowds during commercial breaks.

History
The Nitro Girls were formed in 1997 by Kimberly Page at Eric Bischoff's request and made their debut on July 14 in Orlando, Florida. Their main focus was to entertain the live fans during the commercials of Monday Nitro. They also regularly performed in short segments on the show.

The Nitro Girls filmed their own pay-per-view, dubbed "The Nitro Girls Swimsuit Calendar Special" which aired on August 3, 1999 and was later released on home video.

In late 1999, the group held a competition to find a new member. 300 women took part in the contest; the results were decided by a series of polls on WCW's website, which narrowed down the field to eight finalists. On the November 8, 1999, edition of Nitro, Stacy Keibler was declared the winner of the contest after receiving the most votes out of the eight finalists; she received a spot on the dance troupe, along with a $10,000 prize. Her winning routine was watched by 4.4 million viewers.

The Nitro Girls also made appearances at WCW promotional events and were featured in the WCW produced film Ready to Rumble. As the group became more and more involved in storylines, it slowly dissolved, but never officially broke up until 2001 when WCW was sold to Vince McMahon's World Wrestling Federation.

Involvement in storylines
In October 1999, Kimberly Page began to appear with husband and wrestler Diamond Dallas Page. At Halloween Havoc, she claimed that Ric Flair spanked her 14 times after she was going to drug his son David Flair in a hotel room. Diamond Dallas Page wrestled Ric Flair in a strap match. On the November 1, 1999, episode of Nitro, Kimberly quit the group as a result of her husband being injured by David Flair; she then ran him over with her car.

After Kimberly left, the Nitro Girls began to feud with each other; Spice feuded with A.C. Jazz over the new leadership position and won. After Jazz left the group, Tygress attempted to gain control.

On the November 22, 1999, episode of Nitro, Spice and Tygress competed in the first professional wrestling match involving any of the group's members; Tygress defeated Spice after the latter suffered an injury to her eye.

By early 2000, the Nitro Girls broke up and began to go their own way within WCW. Kimberly Page joined The New Blood. Sharmell Sullivan became Paisley, a valet for The Artist (Prince Iaukea), and later went to the WWE. Stacy Keibler, the final member to join the group, began appearing as Miss Hancock (the manager for the tag team Standards and Practices) before going to the WWE.

Diversity 5 
Several former Nitro Girls formed a pop music group called Diversity 5: Teri Byrne (Fyre), Melissa Bellin (Spice), Sharmell Sullivan (Storm), Chae An (Chae) and Vanessa Sanchez (Tygress). When Sharmell went to the WWF, Chiquita Anderson (Chiquita) replaced her. The D5 group released one CD single "I Promise/Shake Me Up" in 2001. The group appeared on the Fox reality show 30 Seconds to Fame on October 31, 2002, and were promptly voted off.

Members

Notes

References

World Championship Wrestling teams and stables
Women's wrestling teams and stables
Professional wrestling dancers
Performing groups established in 1997